Alexandru Ciupe (born 18 March 1972) is a Romanian judoka. He competed at the 1992 Summer Olympics and the 1996 Summer Olympics.

References

1972 births
Living people
Romanian male judoka
Olympic judoka of Romania
Judoka at the 1992 Summer Olympics
Judoka at the 1996 Summer Olympics
People from Bihor County